Lunch money may refer to:
An allowance, money given by parents to their children for food purchases and other things
Lunch Money (game), a card game
Lunch Money (novel), a 2005 novel by Andrew Clements
"Lunch Money" (song), a hip-hop single
"Lunch Money" (software), a personal finance & budgeting software developed by Lunchbag Labs

See also
ExtraLunchMoney.com, a website
LunchMoney Lewis (Gamal Lewis, born 1988), American rapper, singer, songwriter, and record producer
Vampires Stole My Lunch Money, an album by artist Mick Farren